is a railway station on the Hohi Main Line operated by JR Kyushu in Kikuyō, Kumamoto, Japan.

Lines

Layout 
The station, which is unstaffed, consists of two platforms serving two tracks at grade. The station building is a simple steel frame structure which serves only to house a waiting room and an automatic ticket vending machine. Access to the opposite side platform is by means of a level crossing.

Adjacent stations

History
On 2 December 1928, the entire track from Kumamoto to Ōita was designated as the Hōhi Main Line. With the privatization of Japanese National Railways (JNR), the successor of JGR, on 1 April 1987, the station came under the control of JR Kyushu.

Passenger statistics
In fiscal 2016, the station was used by an average of 668 passengers daily (boarding passengers only), and it ranked 212th among the busiest stations of JR Kyushu.

See also
List of railway stations in Japan

References

External links
Haramizu (JR Kyushu)

Railway stations in Kumamoto Prefecture
Railway stations in Japan opened in 1920